Agundabweni Akweyu (also known  Agunda) is a Kenyan born record producer, co-founder of record label Bwenieve, co-founder of Praise Atmosphere, arranger, composer, songwriter, entrepreneur, audio engineer and a husband to Kenyan gospel musician Evelyn Wanjiru. Based in Nairobi Kenya, he is best known for producing hit songs for both established and uprising musicians. His unique style of production has seen a turn around in  Kenyan gospel music; more musicians aspire to work with him.

Production discography

Singles 

Albums

Awards

References

External links
 www.bwenieve.com

Living people
1980 births
Kenyan record producers
Place of birth missing (living people)
People from Nairobi